François Verger (29 November 1911 – 24 October 2001) was a French field hockey player who competed in the 1936 Summer Olympics. He was a member of the French field hockey team, which finish fourth in the 1936 Olympic tournament. He played four matches as halfback.

References

External links
 

1911 births
2001 deaths
French male field hockey players
Olympic field hockey players of France
Field hockey players at the 1936 Summer Olympics